"Lipstick lesbian" is slang for a lesbian who exhibits a greater amount of feminine gender attributes, such as wearing make-up, dresses or skirts, and having other characteristics associated with feminine women. In popular usage, the term is also used to characterize the feminine gender expression of bisexual women, or the broader topic of female–female sexual activity among feminine women.

An alternate term for lipstick lesbian is doily dyke.

Definitions and society
The term lipstick lesbian was used in San Francisco at least as early as the 1980s. In 1982, Priscilla Rhoades, a journalist with the gay newspaper Sentinel, wrote the feature story "Lesbians for Lipstick".

In 1990, the gay newspaper OutWeek covered the Lesbian Ladies Society, a Washington, D.C.–based social group of "feminine lesbians" that required women to wear a dress or skirt to its functions.

The term lipstick lesbian became popular when used by writer Deborah Bergman, a reporter for the Los Angeles Times.

Some authors have commented that lipstick lesbian is commonly used broadly to refer to feminine bisexual women or to heterosexual women who temporarily show romantic or sexual interest in other women to impress men. For example, Jodie Brian, in Encyclopedia of Gender and Society, Volume 1 (2009), states, "A common depiction of lipstick lesbianism includes conventionally attractive and sexually insatiable women who desire one another but only insofar as their desire is a performance for male onlookers or a precursor to sex with men." In Intersectionality, Sexuality and Psychological Therapies (2012), lipstick lesbian is defined as "a lesbian/bisexual woman who exhibits 'feminine' attributes such as wearing makeup, dresses and high heeled shoes"; the book adds that "more recent iterations of feminine forms of lesbianism such as 'femme' (e.g. wears dresses/skirts or form-fitting jeans, low cut tops, makeup, jewelry), or 'lipstick lesbian' [...], are an attempt to define as both lesbian and feminine."

Some lipstick lesbians say that they choose to perform femininity rather than be subjected to it, adding that they have made an active decision to be feminine, which subverts society's demand of forced femininity. They commonly modify a typical feminine style to make it less heteronormative; Inge Blackman and Kathryn Perry gave the example of "twinning short skirts with Doctor Martens (DMs) or lacy underwear with men's trousers".

Author M. Paz Galupo stated, "Young women exposed to mainstream media outlets are seeing expressions of the same-sex desire between women much more frequently than ever before. However, mainstream images of same-sex desire between women are very specific, meaning they are often of hyper-feminine women ('lipstick lesbians')." The prominence of lipstick lesbians in the media is echoed by Rosalind Gill, who stated, "The figure of the 'luscious lesbian' [lipstick lesbian] within advertising is notable for her extraordinarily attractive, conventionally feminine appearance." Although some authors have said that the existence of lipstick lesbians is a destabilization of heterosexual ideals, by breaking the assumption that a feminine person will always desire a masculine person, and vice versa, others have said that the lipstick lesbian emergence simply fails in this regard, as lipstick lesbians are still subject to the male gaze, and still found acceptable due to their femininity.

In media
The term is thought to have reached wide usage in the 1990s. A 1997 episode of the television show Ellen widely publicized the phrase. In the show, Ellen DeGeneres's character, asked by her parents whether a certain woman is a "dipstick lesbian", explains that the term is lipstick lesbian, and comments, "I would be a ChapStick lesbian." In the 1999 film But I'm a Cheerleader, the character played by Julie Delpy is identified as "Lipstick Lesbian" in the film credits.

Flag controversy

The lipstick lesbian flag was introduced by Natalie McCray in 2010 in the weblog This Lesbian Life. The design contains a red kiss in the left corner, superimposed on seven stripes consisting of six shades of red and pink colors and a white bar in the center. However, it has not been widely adopted; some lesbians have not adopted the flag because it is not inclusive of butch lesbians, while others have accused McCray of writing biphobic, racist, and transphobic comments on her blog.

The "pink" lesbian flag was derived from the lipstick lesbian flag but with the kiss mark removed. The pink flag attracted more use as a general lesbian pride flag.

See also

 Butch and femme
 Girly girl
 Lipstick feminism
 Soft butch

References

Further reading

External links
 The Lipstick Lesbian Page

1980s slang
1990s slang
2000s slang
2010s slang
1980s neologisms
Butch and femme
Gender roles in the LGBT community
Femininity
Lesbian culture
LGBT slang
Slang terms for women
Women and sexuality